The 1976 World Series was the championship series of Major League Baseball's (MLB) 1976 season. The 73rd edition of the World Series, it was a best-of-seven playoff played between the National League (NL) champion  Cincinnati Reds and the American League (AL) champion New York Yankees. The Reds swept the Series in four games to repeat as champions, avenging their 1939 and 1961 World Series losses to the Yankees. The 1976 Reds became, and remain, the only team to sweep an entire multi-tier postseason, one of the crowning achievements of the franchise's Big Red Machine era. They also became the third NL team (following the Chicago Cubs in 1907–08 and the New York Giants in 1921–22) to win consecutive World Series, and remain the last to do so. 

This was also the second time that the Yankees were swept in a World Series—the Los Angeles Dodgers were the first to sweep them in 1963. It was the first sweep of the World Series in ten years and the Reds' first; their next came fourteen years later in 1990.

The Reds won the NL West division by ten games over the Dodgers, then defeated the Philadelphia Phillies in three straight games in the NL Championship Series, after losing seven of twelve to them during the regular season. The Yankees won the AL East division by 10⅛ games over the Baltimore Orioles, then defeated the Kansas City Royals in the deciding fifth game of the AL Championship Series.

This World Series was the first in which the designated hitter rule, which had been introduced in the AL three years prior, was in effect; it was used for all games (for the first ten years, the use of the DH alternated; in even-numbered years, it was used in all games, in odd-numbered years, it was not used; starting in 1986, the DH was used only in games played at the AL representative's park). The use of the DH wound up benefiting the Reds, who were able to get utility infielder Dan Driessen's bat in the lineup. Driessen hit .357 with one home run. Elliott Maddox, Carlos May, and Lou Piniella shared the role for the Yankees. Game 1, played at Cincinnati's Riverfront Stadium, marked the first time the DH was used in a NL ballpark. Game 2, also at Riverfront Stadium, was the first World Series weekend game to be scheduled at night.

Background

After spending the last two years sharing home field with the New York Mets at Shea Stadium, the 1976 New York Yankees returned home to a rebuilt and modified Yankee Stadium. George Steinbrenner had now owned the team for four years, since 1973, with Billy Martin serving the first of his five stints as manager since 1975.  General Manager Gabe Paul made numerous trades getting Mickey Rivers and Ed Figueroa from the Angels for Bobby Bonds; Willie Randolph and Dock Ellis from the Pirates for Doc Medich; and Doyle Alexander, Ken Holtzman, and Grant Jackson from the Orioles for Rudy May, Tippy Martinez, Scott McGregor, and Rick Dempsey.

The heart of the team was Yankee captain, Thurman Munson, whose grit and determination were factors in his winning the 1976 American League MVP award.  Third baseman, Graig Nettles, and first baseman, Chris Chambliss were the key run producers, while speedy outfielders Roy White and Rivers set the table for the power hitters.  Super free agent Catfish Hunter headed the staff while reliever Sparky Lyle led the A.L. in saves with 23.  The Yankees finished  ahead in the A.L. East advancing to the World Series by beating the Kansas City Royals in the fifth game of the playoffs on a ninth-inning walk-off home run by Chambliss.

The defending champion Cincinnati Reds were piloted by Sparky Anderson who had a star-studded lineup led by second baseman Joe Morgan. Catcher Johnny Bench, first baseman Tony Perez, and outfielder George Foster provided enough power to drive in sparkplugs Pete Rose, Ken Griffey, and Morgan, who combined power (27 homers, 111 RBI) and speed (67 stolen bases) from the third-spot in the batting order. Morgan went on to win his second-straight National League Most Valuable Player award, outdistancing runner-up teammate Foster. Foster would go on to win the 1977 MVP award, giving the Reds six MVPs in an eight-year stretch. Bench won MVP honors in 1970 and 1972 while Rose took home the hardware in '73.

The Reds led the NL in every significant offensive category including runs scored, batting average, slugging percentage, on-base percentage, doubles, triples, home runs, RBI, and stolen bases.

On the mound, the Reds relied on left-handers Don Gullett and Fred Norman to pacify the Yankee hitters in Games 1 and 2, respectively. Gullett had come back from a mid-season injury to start Game 1 but had to leave the game in the eighth inning due to a twisted ankle while Norman out-pitched ace Hunter in Game 2. Game 3 in New York pitted effective 1976 NL Rookie of the Year Pat Zachry for the Reds against newly acquired Yankee, Dock Ellis. Ellis only lasted  innings, exiting in the fourth after a home run by Driessen. Game 4 was delayed a day due to rain, but the Reds were ready for the sweep. Bench's two-run home run gave the Reds a 3–1 lead. In the top of the ninth, a frustrated Billy Martin threw a baseball from the dugout onto the field towards home plate umpire Bill Deegan, causing his ejection from the game. In the ninth, Bench's second home run followed by back-to-back doubles by César Gerónimo and Dave Concepción made the score 7–2 and essentially blew the game open. The Cincinnati Reds outscored the New York Yankees, 22–8, and became the first NL team to repeat as World Champions since the 1921–1922 New York Giants. The Reds did not make a single offensive or defensive substitution (save pitching changes) during the entire series. Bench would claim the MVP of the series hitting .533 with two home runs and six runs batted in. His catching counterpart, Thurman Munson, had nine hits, all singles, and a .529 batting average.

Summary

†: postponed from October 20 due to rain

Matchups

Game 1

Joe Morgan got the Reds off to a booming start with a home run in the first off of Doyle Alexander, who had to start because Catfish Hunter had a sore arm and needed another day of rest. The Yankees tied the game in the second when Lou Piniella hit a leadoff double, moved to third on a groundout and scored on Graig Nettles's sacrifice fly. In the third, Dave Concepcion tripled with one out and scored on Pete Rose's sacrifice fly to put the Reds up 2–1. Tony Pérez's RBI single in the sixth extended their lead to 3–1. In the seventh, George Foster hit a leadoff single and scored on a Johnny Bench RBI triple. Bench then scored on a Sparky Lyle wild pitch. The only bad news for the Reds was an injury to starting pitcher Don Gullett, who pulled a calf muscle in the eighth and would be unavailable for the remainder of the Series. It turned out to be Gullett's last appearance in a Reds uniform. Pedro Borbon pitched  shutout innings to close the game.

Game 2

The Reds scored three runs in the second off Catfish Hunter. After a leadoff double by Dan Driessen, George Foster's RBI single put the Reds up 1–0. Foster was caught stealing second, but after a double and walk, Dave Concepción's RBI single made it 2–0 Reds. A walk loaded the bases before a sacrifice fly by Ken Griffey made it 3–0 Reds. The Yankees got on the board on an RBI single by Graig Nettles in the fourth.  In the seventh, the Yankees tied things up on an RBI double by Fred Stanley off  starter Fred Norman and an RBI groundout by Thurman Munson off Jack Billingham.  Meanwhile, Hunter settled into a groove, pitching a complete game and shutting out the Reds until the ninth. With two outs, Ken Griffey reached second when Stanley threw wildly past first after fielding his slow bouncer.  Joe Morgan was walked intentionally and Tony Pérez ended the game by driving in Griffey with a single.

The Sunday night contest, the first weekend World Series game to begin after dark, was played under temperatures that started at 43°F (6°C) and dipped into the 30s as the game progressed.
Major League Baseball commissioner Bowie Kuhn responded to criticism of the scheduling, which was done to accommodate NBC television, by attending the game without wearing an overcoat in spite of the cold nighttime weather.

Game 3

As the Series moved to Yankee Stadium, the Reds struck first with three runs off starter Dock Ellis.  Dan Driessen hit a leadoff single, stole second and scored on an RBI double by George Foster, After Johnny Bench singled, an RBI force-out by César Gerónimo made it 2–0 Reds. Geronimo stole second and scored on an RBI single by Dave Concepción to cap the inning's scoring. Dan Driessen smacked a home run in the fourth. In the bottom of the inning, the Yankees got on the board on Oscar Gamble's single off of Pat Zachry. A seventh inning home run by Jim Mason—the 500th home run in the history of the World Series—cut the Reds' lead to 4–2. Mason became the first of two players to hit a home run in his only World Series at-bat, the second being Geoff Blum in 2005 for the Chicago White Sox. The Reds got both runs back in the eighth on Joe Morgan's RBI double off Grant Jackson after two leadoff singles and Foster's RBI single off Dick Tidrow.

This game featured a slick defensive play by Grant Jackson in the top of the seventh.  Johnny Bench hit a hard grounder up the middle which appeared to be a sure base hit, but Jackson speared the ball with his glove behind his back and retired Bench.

This was the first World Series game at Yankee Stadium to open with opera star Robert Merrill's famous rendition of the National Anthem.

Game 4

The Yankees got on the board in the first (which would be their only lead in this Series) on a two-out Thurman Munson single and a Chris Chambliss double off of Gary Nolan. Munson would collect four hits in the game.  In the fourth, Joe Morgan walked off of Ed Figueroa, stole second, and came home on a George Foster single. Johnny Bench followed with his first home run to give the Reds a 3–1 lead. The Yankees cut the lead to 3–2 in the fifth inning when Mickey Rivers hit a leadoff single, stole second and scored on Munson's single, but the Reds padded that lead in the ninth. Figueroa walked two before being relieved by Dick Tidrow, who allowed a one-out three-run home run to Bench to extend the Reds' lead to 6–2.  César Gerónimo and Dave Concepción followed with consecutive doubles to make 7–2 Reds. Will McEnaney pitched  shutout innings to end the series. It was the Reds' second-straight World Series victory and the second-straight time McEnaney would be on the mound for the Series' final out. It also, to date,  is the only perfect playoff season since the LCS was created in 1969. This was Tony Perez's final game in a Reds uniform until 1984.

Composite box
1976 World Series (4–0): Cincinnati Reds (N.L.) beat New York Yankees (A.L.).

Broadcasting
This was the last of 30 consecutive World Series telecasts by NBC, which had aired the event since 1947; under Major League Baseball's new television contract, Series coverage would now alternate between NBC (in even-numbered years) and rival network ABC (in odd-numbered years) each year; this arrangement would end after the 1989 World Series, and CBS would hold exclusive rights to MLB games for the next four years. It was also the last time that local announcers for the participating teams (the Reds' Marty Brennaman and the Yankees' Phil Rizzuto, in this case) would be regularly featured on the network telecast.

This was the first of 21 consecutive World Series to be broadcast by CBS Radio.

Notes

See also
1976 Japan Series

References

External links

 1976 ALCS | Game 5 at MLB.com
Sporting News' Baseball's 25 Greatest Moments: The Chris Chambliss Walk-Off Home Run at SportingNews.com
 Reds History at redshistory.com
 The 1976 Cincinnati Reds at baseballlibrary.com
 The 1976 New York Yankees at baseballlibrary.com

World Series
World Series
Cincinnati Reds postseason
New York Yankees postseason
World Series
World Series
1970s in Cincinnati
Baseball competitions in New York City
World Series
Baseball competitions in Cincinnati
1970s in the Bronx